Bear Creek 3 Airport  is a public-use airport located three nautical miles (4 mi, 6 km) west of the central business district of Bear Creek, in the Yukon-Koyukuk Census Area of the U.S. state of Alaska.

Facilities and aircraft 
For the 12-month period ending December 31, 2005, the airport had 300 aircraft operations, an average of 25 per month: 67% air taxi and 33% general aviation.

Other airports in Bear Creek 
It has gravel runway designated 10/28 which measures .

References

External links 

 FAA Alaska airport diagram 
 Topographic map as of 1 July 1955 from USGS The National Map

Airports in the Yukon–Koyukuk Census Area, Alaska